"What's Your Name" is a popular song written by Claude "Juan" Johnson. Released by the duo Don and Juan on Big Top Records in 1962, it climbed to #7 on the Billboard pop charts. It was their only Top 40 hit.

Chart performance

References

1962 songs